The Philippine Senate Committee on Economic Affairs is a standing committee of the Senate of the Philippines.

Jurisdiction 
According to the Rules of the Senate, the committee handles all matters relating to:

 Economic planning and programming
 Planning of domestic and foreign public indebtedness
 General economic development
 Coordination, regulation and diversification of industry and investments

Members, 18th Congress 
Based on the Rules of the Senate, the Senate Committee on Economic Affairs has 9 members.

The President Pro Tempore, the Majority Floor Leader, and the Minority Floor Leader are ex officio members.

Here are the members of the committee in the 18th Congress as of September 24, 2020:

Committee secretary: Elizabeth F. Agas

See also 

 List of Philippine Senate committees

References 

Economic